"Don't Mean Nothing" is the debut single by singer/songwriter/producer Richard Marx from his triple platinum 1987 eponymous album.  It hit No. 1 on Billboards Album Rock Tracks chart and No. 3 on the Hot 100. With the chart success of "Don't Mean Nothing" and subsequent singles from his debut album, Marx became the first male artist to reach the top three of the Billboard Hot 100 pop chart with four singles from a debut album.

The song was aided by a popular MTV music video that featured Cynthia Rhodes, who would later become Marx's first wife. In 1988, Marx was nominated for a Grammy Award for "Best Rock Vocal Performance - Solo" for "Don't Mean Nothing".  He competed against Bruce Springsteen, Tina Turner, Bob Seger, and Joe Cocker.

Background and writing
According to Marx's personal commentary about the song's origin, his manager at the time asked Joe Walsh to play slide guitar on the song and he agreed.  As a fan of the Eagles, Marx felt that musically the song could have belonged on the album The Long Run.  Two other Eagles members, Randy Meisner and Timothy B. Schmit, sang background vocals on the song.  Marx reportedly wrote the lyrics himself and co-wrote the music for this song with Bruce Gaitsch at his first apartment on Lowry Road in the Los Feliz district of Los Angeles, where Marx resided during the early 1980s.

Versions
There are at least four recorded versions of this song:
 Album version - 4:41
 7" radio edit version - 3:59
 "Extended Rock Mix" version from 12" single - 6:15
 Live version recorded at the Palace Theatre in Los Angeles, CA, from the "Angelia" 12" single - 8:11

Personnel 
 Richard Marx – lead and backing vocals 
 Michael Omartian – acoustic piano
 Bruce Gaitsch – rhythm guitar
 Joe Walsh – rhythm guitar, guitar solo
 Nathan East – bass 
 John Keane – drums 
 Randy Meisner – backing vocals 
 Timothy B. Schmit – backing vocals

Chart performance
As the lead single from Richard Marx, the song saw success on both the Billboard Hot 100 singles and Album Rock Tracks charts. The single entered the Hot 100 chart upon release at number 78 and, 12 weeks later, reached its peak of number 3. The song also became a number-one hit on the Album Rock Tracks chart. In the UK, the song peaked at number 78.

Charts

References

External links
 

1987 songs
1987 debut singles
Richard Marx songs
Songs written by Richard Marx
Songs written by Bruce Gaitsch
Music videos directed by Dominic Sena
Manhattan Records singles